Andrea Joy Cook (born July 22, 1978) is a Canadian actress. She is best known for her role as Supervisory Special Agent Jennifer "JJ" Jareau on the CBS crime drama Criminal Minds (2005–2020, 2022–). Cook has also appeared in The Virgin Suicides (1999), Higher Ground (2000), Ripper (2001), Out Cold (2001), Final Destination 2 (2003), and Tru Calling (2003–2004).

Early life
Cook was born in Oshawa, Ontario. She spent most of her early life in nearby Whitby, where she attended Anderson Collegiate Vocational Institute. She has three siblings: Nathan, Paul, and Angela. Cook was declared legally blind in the second grade because of severe astigmatism, but wore contacts and thick “coke bottle” glasses to correct her vision. In 2007 she underwent surgery during which a lens implant corrected the impairment. Talking about her childhood, Cook recalled how other kids were “cruel” and that she “really couldn’t see” and “everything looked like a smear of color with no shapes”. She also said that at the time of her diagnosis, she was not doing well in school and at first, people thought she had a learning disability because she could not read but in reality, she could not see the board which affected her ability to recognize letters and know the sounds they made.

A dancer from age four, Cook began taking jazz, tap and ballet lessons. She said that dance kept her engaged growing up as she did not have to recite or read anything. She danced competitively for many years, before deciding at the age of 16 that she wanted to try acting. Cook also taught dance when she was younger and has stated that if she hadn't become an actress, she would most likely have set up a small dance studio somewhere. In an interview, she said that she still tap dances.

Career
Cook's first job was in a McDonald's commercial in 1997. She graduated to series work with a guest role on the television series Goosebumps, and parts in two television movies, In His Father's Shoes and Elvis Meets Nixon. Cook launched her feature film career as one of five suicidal Lisbon sisters in 1999's The Virgin Suicides. Also that year, she took a starring role in the TV series Higher Ground, in which Cook played Shelby Merrick, a teenage girl dealing with abuse and heartache at a wilderness school for struggling kids. Higher Ground lasted one season, ending with a romance between Shelby and Hayden Christensen's character, Scott.

After Higher Ground, Cook appeared in the 2000 TV movie The Spiral Staircase (alongside Higher Ground alum Kandyse McClure), and then captured leading roles in several films, including Out Cold (as Jason London's love interest), Ripper, I'm Reed Fish, and Final Destination 2. In 2003, Cook guest starred in Dead Like Me. She was also in Season One of Tru Calling as Lindsay Walker.

Beginning in September 2005, she starred as Jennifer "J.J." Jareau in the CBS drama Criminal Minds. On June 14, 2010, it was announced that her contract option would not be picked up for season six as a series regular reportedly due to budget cuts on the show, but she returned for two episodes to wrap up her character's storyline due to thousands of letters and petitions written to the show's producers. She also returned for one episode for the departure of Paget Brewster from the series. Former executive producer of ''Criminal Minds'', Ed Bernero, later claimed that CBS executives called him one day and asked him to get rid of Cook and Brewster. Brewster also mentioned in a separate interview that someone from CBS called Bernero and said they wanted "new women" which led to their firing. She said that it was not due to budget cuts as their replacement was paid twice what they were paid.

On April 16, 2011, it was reported that Cook had signed to reappear for two more seasons of the show. In 2013, Cook and ''Criminal Minds'' co-star Kirsten Vangsness managed to negotiate salary raises but not parity after years of being paid less than half the salary of fellow co-stars Matthew Gray Gubler and Shemar Moore. In 2017, both women held out on signing new contracts as they sought pay parity with Gubler. They eventually succeeded and closed new deals to return. Cook would continue to star in the series until it ended in 2020 after 15 seasons. After the show wrapped, Cook decided to take a break from acting and in 2022, she guest-starred on the show 9-1-1. It was also announced that she would be returning for the Criminal Minds revival.

Other ventures
In 2013, it was announced she was hired as a spokeswoman for Proactiv. She appeared in the January/February 2014 issue of Maxim magazine.
She was ranked at 88 on the Maxim Hot 100 2014 list. She was the Grand Marshal for the STP 500 at Martinsville Speedway in Martinsville, Virginia on April 3, 2016.

Personal life
Cook was raised in the Church of Jesus Christ of Latter-day Saints, but she does not limit her acting solely to roles reflecting Mormon beliefs. On August 3, 2001, she married her long-time boyfriend, Nathan Andersen. The two met in a film class at Utah Valley University, and she later moved to Salt Lake City, Utah, to be with him. They reside in Los Angeles, California, with their two sons.

In September 2008, their first son, Mekhai Allan, was born. He appeared as Henry LaMontagne throughout the Criminal Minds series. The couple's second son, Phoenix Sky, was born in July 2015. Cook and her husband named him Phoenix because they were told that they couldn't have any more children but Phoenix was a surprise and "just rose up". He also appeared in Criminal Minds, as Jareau's second son, Michael.

Filmography

Film

Television

Director

References

External links 

 
 
 A. J. Cook Bio at CBS—Criminal Minds

1978 births
Canadian expatriate actresses in the United States
Canadian film actresses
Canadian television actresses
Living people
Actresses from Oshawa
People from Whitby, Ontario
20th-century Canadian actresses
21st-century Canadian actresses
Utah Valley University alumni
Canadian Latter Day Saints